Nikolay Mikhailovich Zirikov (born 22 May 2000) is a Russian football player. He plays for FC Dynamo Saint Petersburg.

Club career
He made his debut in the Russian Football National League for FC Shinnik Yaroslavl on 13 October 2020 in a game against FC Neftekhimik Nizhnekamsk.

Personal life
His older brother Ivan Zirikov is also a football goalkeeper.

References

External links
 Profile by Russian Football National League
 

2000 births
Footballers from Moscow
Living people
Russian footballers
Russia youth international footballers
Association football goalkeepers
PFC CSKA Moscow players
FC Shinnik Yaroslavl players
FC Dynamo Saint Petersburg players